Cambérène is a commune d'arrondissement of the city of Dakar, Senegal. As of 2013 it had a population of 52,420.

Arrondissements of Dakar